Gavin Andrew Stuart Newlands (born 2 February 1980) is a Scottish National Party politician. He has been the Member of Parliament (MP) for Paisley and Renfrewshire North since the 2015 general election. He has served as the SNP Shadow Secretary of State for Transport since 2020.

Newlands is the first ever MP for the constituency to be elected from the SNP. At the 2017 general election, he was re-elected, with a reduced majority of 9,076 votes to 2,613. Subsequently, at the 2019 election Newlands achieved his biggest majority in the seat, of 11,902 or 24.0% of the vote.

Early life
Newlands was born in the old Paisley Maternity Hospital in 1980 and raised in the town of Renfrew, where he currently resides with wife, Lynn and their two children. He was educated at Renfrew's St James' Primary and Trinity High School. While enrolled at James Watt College, Newlands was offered a promotion in his part-time job at McDonalds, and dropped out of college.

Newlands has been a member of the SNP for 25 years. He joined the youth wing of the party in 1992 at the age of twelve. He became a local community council councillor for Renfrew in 2011 and has supported local causes, including a West of Scotland foodbank. Newlands was a member of Paisley Rugby Club for 16 years, serving as club captain for three years.

Parliamentary career
Newlands was selected to stand for election for the Scottish National Party (SNP) in January 2015 after securing the support of local party members following an internal selection process. He was elected to the House of Commons at the 2015 Westminster election when he overturned the incumbent Labour MP's 15,280 majority and emerged with a majority of 9,076 votes for himself - representing a 26.47% swing to Newlands and the SNP.

He is currently the Westminster SNP Spokesperson on Transport, having previously led for the party on Sport, Wales, and Northern Ireland, as well as being Chair of the White Ribbon All-Party Parliamentary Group (APPG) on Male Violence Against Women and is Chair of the APPG on Scottish Sport. He serves on the Justice Select Committee.

Newlands is an ambassador for White Ribbon Scotland and has participated in parliamentary debates on International Men's Day to speak about violence against women. On 25 November 2021, during a parliamentary debate on International Men's Day, Newlands spoke in criticism of the holiday, describing it as an "anathema to me" and "a rather cruel joke concocted in response to feminism, women's rights and International Women's Day". When challenged on his views by Conservative MP Nick Fletcher, Newlands said that "we need men in general to take responsibility for what men have done and continue to do - including making misogynistic comments or committing violence against women."

In 2020, he introduced a bill banning exploitative Fire and Rehire practices.

He was reappointed as the SNP Spokesperson for Transport by Leader Stephen Flynn.

References

External links 
 SNP profile
 

1980 births
Living people
Members of the Parliament of the United Kingdom for Paisley constituencies
People from Renfrew
Scottish National Party MPs
UK MPs 2015–2017
UK MPs 2017–2019
UK MPs 2019–present
21st-century Scottish politicians
Councillors in Renfrewshire
Scottish National Party councillors